Jeremy Foley (born Geronimo Jeremiah Foley on February 20, 1983, in Albuquerque, New Mexico) is an American actor and director. Foley is perhaps best known for his roles as Billy in the Buffy the Vampire Slayer episode "Nightmares" and Griffen Lowe in the Nickelodeon show Caitlin's Way.

Foley also played Graham in the 1997 film Dante's Peak and voiced the titular ghost in Casper: A Spirited Beginning and Casper Meets Wendy. He also played Clay in the 1999 movie Soccer Dog. In 2015, he directed Fated and in 2018 The Faceless Man.

Films and TV series

Dante's Peak
Chicago Hope
Buffy the Vampire Slayer
Casper: A Spirited Beginning
The Ugly Duckling
Hiller and Diller
Touched by an Angel
 Legion of Fire: Killer Ants!
Casper Meets Wendy
Maggie
The New Batman Adventures
Soccer Dog: The Movie
Stray Dog
The Wonderful World of Disney
Diaries of Darkness
Caitlin's Way
Blink
The Guardians
Roommate Wanted
Action News 5

External links
 
 Official website

1983 births
American male child actors
American male film actors
American male television actors
American male voice actors
Living people
20th-century American male actors